Perezi Karukubiro Kamunanwire is a Ugandan academic and diplomat. He was Ambassador of Uganda to the United States from 2006 to 2013. He was appointed to that post on 15 May 2006 and served until June 2013.

Education
Perezi Kamunanwire obtained the degree of Bachelor of Arts in Political Science, from Columbia University. He also holds a Master of Arts degree in International Relations, from the same university. In 2003, Ignatius College in New York awarded him an honorary degree of Doctor of Laws (LLD), in recognition of his lifetime contribution in the area of international relations. He is fluent in English and five other African languages, including: Kinyarwanda, Lingala, Luganda, Runyankole and Swahili.

Diplomatic and Professional career
Between 1986 and 1988, Perezi Kamunanwire served as Uganda's Ambassador to Germany and between 1988 and 1996 he was Uganda's Permanent Representative at the United Nations in New York City. He has taught at the City College of the City University of New York, where he also directed programs in black studies and international relations. Starting in 2003, he served as an adjunct professor at the Center for Conflict Management and Organizational Research associated with Sophia University in Bulgaria. He has written and co-authored several academic books and scholarly papers in the area of International Relations.

References

External links
Uganda Embassy Homepage
 Photo of Ambassador Perezi Kamunanwire

Living people
Columbia College (New York) alumni
School of International and Public Affairs, Columbia University alumni
Ugandan diplomats
Ambassadors of Uganda to the United States
Ambassadors of Uganda to Germany
Permanent Representatives of Uganda to the United Nations
Uganda–United States relations
Year of birth missing (living people)